Alexey Sergeevich Zozulin (born January 14, 1983) is a Russian professional basketball player who last played for Lokomotiv Kuban of the VTB United League. He also represents the Russia national basketball team internationally.

Professional career
Zozulin has spent his entire career playing for teams in the top division of Russian basketball. Career highlights include winning the Russia Cup with UNICS Kazan in 2003 and playing in the Eurocup with Ural Great Perm in 2007 and 2008. In his most recent season, 2008–09, he averaged 6.9 points and 2.4 rebounds per game for Spartak Saint Petersburg.

On 26 July 2012, Zozulin signed one-year deal with option to extend for one season with the Russian team CSKA Moscow. On July 7, 2014, he re-signed with CSKA for one more season and an option for another.

On August 1, 2015, he joined Lokomotiv Kuban on a one-year deal with a team option. On December 25, 2015, he parted ways with Lokomotiv.

National team career
Zozulin has also been a member of the senior Russian national basketball team.  He was called up to the team for the first time at Eurobasket 2009.  Although the Russians finished a disappointing seventh, they were later awarded a wild card to the 2010 FIBA World Championship.

Zozulin also played for the Russian junior team between 1999–2002, most notably appearing with the team at the World Championship for Junior Men in 2000 and World Championship for Young Men in 2002.

References

External links
 Aleksei Zozulin at eurobasket.com
 Aleksey Zozulin at euroleague.net
 Aleksei Zozulin at fiba.com
 Aleksei Zozulin at vtb-league.com

1983 births
Living people
BC Spartak Saint Petersburg players
BC UNICS players
PBC CSKA Moscow players
PBC Lokomotiv-Kuban players
PBC Ural Great players
Russian men's basketball players
Shooting guards